Ramona Gonzalez (known professionally as Nite Jewel) is an American singer-songwriter from Los Angeles, California.

Biography
Ramona Gonzalez began as Nite Jewel in 2008 as the result of her juggling music with undergraduate studies. She cites artists such as Janet Jackson and Mariah Carey as her musical inspirations. With assistance from her husband, Cole M.G.N., she created songs on a portable eight-track cassette recorder. She stated that "moments of ecstasy, emotion, and hardship" were her inspiration for those recordings. in 2009 she released the album Good Evening.

Soon after starting her MySpace music page, her song, "Suburbia" was selected to be in Noah Baumbach's film Greenberg. Within a year she was touring European festivals. Her music draws comparison to Lisa Lisa and Cult Jam. Nite Jewel describes herself more as "liquid cool" citing English electronic music duo Autechre as a major musical influence.
 
Ramona Gonzalez has a bachelor's degree in philosophy from Occidental College. She is also a multimedia artist and has exhibited a number of video and sound installation pieces in the L.A area, one of which was entitled The Question Concerning Technology

December 6, 2011, Nite Jewel released her single, "She's Always Watching You". On March 6, 2012, Ramona released her second album One Second of Love, on Secretly Canadian. The company reissued the first album, Good Evening, on vinyl in 2012.

Since releasing her debut album for Secretly Canadian, Nite Jewel has toured both North America and Europe. She performed Kraftwerk's Computer World in Los Angeles' Krautrock Classics on June 1, 2012. Later that summer, she traveled to New York City to perform in the same event at Le Poisson Rouge.

On April 29, 2012, Nite Jewel performed at the Brandeis University Springfest.

In 2013, her song Nowhere To Go was featured in Grand Theft Auto V'''s in-game radio station, Radio Mirror Park.

Gonzalez left Secretly Canadian and recorded her third album, Liquid Cool, which was released in June 2016 on her own label, Gloriette.

On August 27, 2021, her fifth studio album No Sun was released via Gloriette.

Personal life
In January 2006, Gonzalez married Cole Marsden Greif-Neill. The couple split in 2018 after twelve years of marriage. In 2018, she began a Ph.D. in musicology at the University of California, Los Angeles, where she teaches Audio Technology.

Discography
LPs
 Good Evening (2008)
 One Second of Love (2012)
 Liquid Cool (2016)
 Real High (2017)
 No Sun (2021)

EPs
 Want You Back (2009)
 You F O (2009)
 Am I Real? (2010)
 Nite Funk (2016) (with Dam-Funk)
 Obsession (2017)

Singles
 What Did He Say (2008)
 She's Always Watching You (2011)
 It Goes Through Your Head'' (2011)

Collaborations
 Nite Jewelia – collaboration between Nite Jewel and Julia Holter
 "Am I Gonna Make It" – Nite Funk (collaboration between Nite Jewel and Dâm-Funk)
 Heart Shaped Rock EP – Jason Grier w/Nite Jewel
"Thinking About You" – Frank Ocean cover done by Nite Jewel & Nicholas Krgovich
"What We See" – collaboration between Nite Jewel & Julia Holter for Dublab
 AMTHST – collaboration between Nite Jewel and Droop-E

References

Year of birth missing (living people)
Living people
American electronic musicians
American women in electronic music
Occidental College alumni
University of California, Los Angeles alumni
Secretly Canadian artists
Mexican Summer artists
21st-century American women